Mary Katherine Loyacano McCravey (April 1, 1910 – March 27, 2009) was an American landscape and still life painter. She won the Mississippi Arts Commission's Governor's Excellence in the Arts Award for Lifetime Achievement in 2004.

References

1910 births
2009 deaths
People from Forest, Mississippi
Belhaven University alumni
Painters from Mississippi
American women painters
American landscape painters
American still life painters
20th-century American women artists
20th-century American painters
21st-century American women artists
21st-century American painters